Dor Mărunt is a commune in Călărași County, Muntenia, Romania. It is composed of six villages: Dâlga, Dâlga-Gară, Dor Mărunt, Înfrățirea, Ogoru and Pelinu.

At the 2011 census, the population of Dor Mărunt was 6,349.

References

Communes in Călărași County
Localities in Muntenia